James Gerard Dinn is a Canadian politician, who was elected to the Newfoundland and Labrador House of Assembly in the 2019 provincial election. He represents the electoral district of St. John's Centre as a member of the Newfoundland and Labrador New Democratic Party. He was re-elected in the 2021 Newfoundland and Labrador general election.

Dinn also served as president of the Newfoundland and Labrador Teachers’ Association (2013-2017) and had also served on the executive board of the Canadian Teachers' Federation. He also served as president of the Salmonid Association of Eastern Newfoundland. Dinn did his teaching internship at Netteswell Comprehensive School in England and later taught at Holy Heart of Mary Regional High School.

Dinn's brother Paul is a Progressive Conservative Member of the House of Assembly.

Politics
Dinn won the NDP nomination in St. John's Centre ahead of the 2019 election after incumbent MHA Gerry Rogers opted not to seek re-elected. He defeated his nearest opponent, PC candidate and former city councilor Jonathan Galgay, by more than 900 votes. Dinn earned the highest vote share of any NDP candidate.

In November 2019, Jim Dinn and his brother, fellow MHA Paul Dinn, both endorsed a Liberal proposal to use highway cameras to reduce speeding. Paul Dinn spoke about their brother Mike who was killed in 2009 while cycling.

Leadership (2021-)
On October 19, 2021, he was named interim leader of the New Democratic Party, following the resignation of Alison Coffin. In 2022, the NDP caucus grew after former PC MHA Lela Evans joined the party.

Dinn and his party were the only political party in Newfoundland and Labrador that opposed the Bay du Nord offshore oil project and instead called for the province to reduce its reliance on fossil fuels. Following the announcement that the project had been approved by the federal government in April 2022, Dinn called it "bittersweet". He praised the project for the benefits that it would provide for many workers and their families while also claiming that the provincial and federal governments were ignoring the impacts of climate change.

In March 2022, Dinn praised the confidence and supply agreement between the federal NDP and the Liberal Party of Canada.

Leadership bid
Dinn initially rejected the possibility of running for the role of NDP leader, instead preferring to only serve in an interim capacity. However, Dinn expressed interest in running for permanent leadership in early 2023.

On February 16, 2023, Dinn announced that he would run for the role of permanent leader.

References

Living people
Newfoundland and Labrador New Democratic Party MHAs
Politicians from St. John's, Newfoundland and Labrador
21st-century Canadian politicians
Canadian schoolteachers
Leaders of the Newfoundland and Labrador NDP/CCF
1960 births